There have been two baronetcies created for persons with the surname Dormer, both in the Baronetage of England. One creation is extant as of 2010.

The Dormer Baronetcy, of Wing (or Wenge or Wyng) in the County of Buckingham, was created in the Baronetage of England on 10 June 1615. For more information on this creation, see the Baron Dormer.

The Dormer Baronetcy, of Lee Grange in the County of Buckingham, was created in the Baronetage of England on 23 July 1661 for John Dormer. The title became extinct on the death of the second Baronet in 1726.

Dormer baronets, of Wing (1615)
see the Baron Dormer

Dormer baronets, of Lee Grange (1661)
Sir John Dormer, 1st Baronet (–1675) 
Sir William Dormer, 2nd Baronet (1669–1726)

References

 

1615 establishments in England
Baronetcies in the Baronetage of England
Extinct baronetcies in the Baronetage of England